The AACTA International Award for Best Screenplay is an accolade given by the Australian Academy of Cinema and Television Arts (AACTA), a non-profit organisation whose aim is to "identify, award, promote, and celebrate Australia's greatest achievements in film and television". The award is presented at the annual AACTA International Awards, which rewards achievements in feature films, regardless of the country the film was made. The winners and nominees are determined by the international chapter of the academy, which comprises eighty members of Australian filmmakers and executives.

The prize was first handed out at the 1st AACTA International Awards presentation, and awarded to George Clooney, Grant Heslov, and Beau Willimon for The Ides of March, and to J. C. Chandor for Margin Call.

Winners and nominees
In the following table, the winner is marked in a separate colour, and highlighted in boldface; the nominees are those that are not highlighted or in boldface.

2010s

2020s

See also
 AACTA Awards
 AACTA Award for Best Original Screenplay
 AACTA Award for Best Adapted Screenplay

References

External links
 The Australian Academy of Cinema and Television Arts Official website

S
Screenwriting awards for film